Alex Reid or Alexander Reid may refer to:

Alexander Reid (doctor) (1586–1643), Charles I's physician
Sir Alexander Reid, 2nd Baronet (died 1750), Scottish politician, Member of Parliament for Elgin Burghs, 1710–13
Alexander Walker Reid (1853–1938), New Zealand farmer and inventor 
Alex Reid (art dealer) (1854–1928), Scottish art dealer
Alexander Reid (playwright) (1914–1982), Scottish playwright
Sir Alexander Reid, 3rd Baronet (1932–2019)
Alex Reid (footballer, born 1947) (1947–1998), Scottish footballer
Alex Reid (screenwriter) (born 1965), American TV writer/producer
Alex Reid (fighter) (born 1975), English mixed martial artist
Alex Reid (actress) (born 1980), English actress
Alexandra Reid (born 1992), American singer
Alex Reid (footballer, born 1995), English footballer

See also
Alec Reid (disambiguation)
Alex Reed (disambiguation)
Alec Reed (born 1934), British businessman
Alexander Read (disambiguation)